The 2019–20 season was Zalaegerszegi TE's 1st competitive season, 39th consecutive season in the OTP Bank Liga and 99th year in existence as a football club.

First team squad

Transfers

Summer

In:

Out:

Winter

In:

Out:

Source:

Statistics

Appearances and goals
Last updated on 27 June 2020.

|-
|colspan="14"|Youth players:

|-
|colspan="14"|Out to loan:

|-
|colspan="14"|Players no longer at the club:

|-
|}

Top scorers
Includes all competitive matches. The list is sorted by shirt number when total goals are equal.
Last updated on 27 June 2020

Disciplinary record
Includes all competitive matches. Players with 1 card or more included only.

Last updated on 27 June 2020

Overall
{|class="wikitable"
|-
|Games played || 40 (33 OTP Bank Liga and 7 Hungarian Cup)
|-
|Games won || 16 (11 OTP Bank Liga and 5 Hungarian Cup)
|-
|Games drawn || 10 (10 OTP Bank Liga and 0 Hungarian Cup)
|-
|Games lost || 14 (12 OTP Bank Liga and 2 Hungarian Cup)
|-
|Goals scored || 73
|-
|Goals conceded || 57
|-
|Goal difference || +16
|-
|Yellow cards || 71
|-
|Red cards || 7
|-
|rowspan="1"|Worst discipline ||  Gergő Kocsis (7 , 1 )
|-
|rowspan="1"|Best result || 6–0 (A) v Kaposvár - Nemzeti Bajnokság I - 29-5-2020
|-
|rowspan="1"|Worst result || 0–5 (A) v Fehérvár - Hungarian Cup - 11-3-2020
|-
|rowspan="3"|Most appearances ||  Bence Bedi (37 appearances)
|-
|  Patrik Demjén (37 appearances)
|-
|  András Radó (37 appearances)
|-
|rowspan="2"|Top scorer ||  Gergely Bobál (13 goals)
|-
|  András Radó (13 goals)
|-
|Points || 58/120 (48.33%)
|-

Nemzeti Bajnokság I

Matches

League table

Results summary

Results by round

Hungarian Cup

References

External links
 Official Website
 UEFA
 fixtures and results

Zalaegerszegi TE seasons
Hungarian football clubs 2019–20 season